The Alna School is located on Alna Road in the town of Alna, Maine. Built in 1795, it is one of the oldest surviving school buildings in the state.  It has also housed Alna's town offices.  It was added to the National Register of Historic Places on April 28, 1975.

Description and history
The Alna School is located in central Alna, a rural community in Lincoln County, Maine.  It is set on the west side of Alna Road (Maine State Route 218), north of its junction with Golden Ridge Road and south of the historic Alna Meetinghouse.  The school is a single story wood-frame structure, with a low-pitch hipped roof topped by an open octagonal cupola with bell.  Its exterior is finished in wooden clapboards, and it rests on a brick foundation.  There are two windows on each side, with the main entrance set near one corner.  A small single story addition, of 20th-century origin, has been added.

The school was built in 1795, by either Moses Carlton or Samuel Averill, each of whom was contracted by the newly incorporated town to build a school; it is not known which of the two built this school.  The cupola was added in the early 19th century.  The building served the town as a school well into the 20th century.  It is the second-oldest school in Maine; only the Old Schoolhouse in York is older (1755).

See also

National Register of Historic Places listings in Lincoln County, Maine

References

School buildings on the National Register of Historic Places in Maine
Federal architecture in Maine
School buildings completed in 1795
Schools in Lincoln County, Maine
Defunct schools in Maine
Town halls in Maine
National Register of Historic Places in Lincoln County, Maine
1795 establishments in Massachusetts